Presidential elections were held in Cameroon on 12 October 1997. They were boycotted by the main opposition parties, the Social Democratic Front, the National Union for Democracy and Progress, and the Cameroon Democratic Union, as well as the smaller African Peoples Union. As a result, incumbent President Paul Biya was re-elected with 92.57% of the vote. Voter turnout was 83.1%.

Results

References

Cameroon
1997 in Cameroon
1997
October 1997 events in Africa